Geoff Masters (born 19 September 1950) is an Australian former tennis player. He was part of doubles winning pairs in the US Open, Australian Open and Wimbledon tournaments during the 1970s.

Tennis career
Born in Brisbane, Queensland, Masters with Pam Teeguarden won the mixed doubles at the US Open in 1974. That year he also won the Australian Open's men's doubles with Ross Case. With the same partner Masters won the gentleman's doubles at Wimbledon in 1977.

Career finals

Doubles (23 wins, 18 losses)

Post-tennis playing career
Masters can be heard calling Australian Open and Wimbledon matches for the Nine Network.

References

External links
 
 
 
 

1950 births
Living people
Australian male tennis players
Australian Open (tennis) champions
Australian tennis coaches
Australian tennis commentators
Tennis players from Brisbane
US Open (tennis) champions
Wimbledon champions
Grand Slam (tennis) champions in mixed doubles
Grand Slam (tennis) champions in men's doubles